Gaultheria rupestris is a shrub in the family Ericaceae. This species is endemic to New Zealand.

Description 
This species is can grow up to 1.5 m tall and has branches that are either erect or spreading. Adult leaves are coloured brownish to dark green. G. rupestris produces clusters of white flowers.

References

rupestris
Endemic flora of New Zealand